Stenocrepis cuprea is a species of beetle in the family Carabidae. It is found in Ontario, Canada and the United States.

References

Further reading

 
 
 

Harpalinae
Beetles described in 1843
Taxa named by Maximilien Chaudoir